The Bernie Naylor Medal is an Australian rules football award which is given to the leading goalkicker at the end of each home and away season in the West Australian Football League. It is named after South Fremantle full-forward Bernie Naylor. Before the Bernie Naylor Medal, there was no physical trophy given to the competition's leading goalkicker, although there had been proposals for such a trophy to be instituted.

Leading goalkickers

The goal tallies listed below include those kicked in the finals where applicable. 
A * is used to show instances where players tied for the award after the home and away season.

 2022 - Ben Sokol (Subiaco) - 41 goals
 2021 - Tyler Keitel (West Perth) - 64 goals
 2020 - Mason Shaw (South Fremantle) - 23 goals
 2019 - Ben Sokol (Subiaco) - 51 goals
 2018 - Andrew Strijk* (West Perth) - 51 goals
 2018 - Tyler Keitel* (West Perth) - 50 goals
 2017 - Liam Ryan (Subiaco) - 71 goals 
 2016 - Ben Saunders (South Fremantle) - 52 goals
 2015 - Shane Yarran (Subiaco) - 54 goals
 2014 - Ben Saunders (South Fremantle) - 59 goals
 2013 - Josh Smith (East Perth) - 62 goals
 2012 - Ben Saunders (South Fremantle) - 66 goals
 2011 - Blake Broadhurst (Subiaco) - 68 goals
 2010 - Chad Jones (Claremont) - 85 goals
 2009 - Chad Jones (Claremont) - 77 goals
 2008 - Brad Smith (Subiaco) - 110 goals
 2007 - Brad Smith (Subiaco) - 126 goals
 2006 - Troy Wilson (East Perth) - 74 goals
 2005 - Lachlan Oakley (Subiaco) - 80 goals
 2004 - Brad Smith (Subiaco) - 109 goals
 2003 - Brad Smith (Subiaco) - 84 goals
 2002 - Zane Parsons (South Fremantle) - 65 goals
 2001 - Paul Medhurst (Claremont) - 78 goals
 2000 - Rod Tregenza (East Fremantle) - 86 goals
 1999 - Rod Tregenza (East Fremantle) - 57 goals
 1998 - Todd Ridley (Subiaco) - 77 goals
 1997 - Jon Dorotich (South Fremantle) - 114 goals
 1996 - Jon Dorotich (South Fremantle) - 88 goals
 1995 - Jason Heatley (Subiaco) - 123 goals
 1994 - Brenton Cooper (Perth) - 90 goals
 1993 - Jason Heatley (Subiaco) - 111 goals
 1992 - Kevin Caton* (Swan Districts) - 51 goals
 1992 - Craig Edwards* (South Fremantle) - 54 goals
 1991 - John Hutton (Claremont) - 100 goals
 1990 - Glen Bartlett (East Perth) - 69 goals
 1989 - Neil Lester-Smith (East Fremantle) - 90 goals
 1988 - Todd Breman (Subiaco) - 75 goals
 1987 - Todd Breman (Subiaco) - 111 goals
 1986 - Mick Rea (Perth) - 90 goals
 1985 - Mick Rea (Perth) - 100 goals
 1984 - Brent Hutton (Swan Districts) - 83 goals
 1983 - Warren Ralph (Claremont) - 128 goals
 1982 - Warren Ralph (Claremont) - 115 goals
 1981 - Warren Ralph (Claremont) - 127 goals
 1980 - Warren Ralph* (Claremont) - 85 goals
 1980 - Simon Beasley* (Swan Districts) - 97 goals
 1979 - Kevin Taylor (East Fremantle) - 102 goals
 1978 - Ray Bauskis (South Fremantle) - 82 goals
 1977 - Ray Bauskis (South Fremantle) - 108 goals
 1976 - Norm Uncle (Claremont) - 91 goals
 1975 - Murray Couper (Perth) - 63 goals
 1974 - Max George (Swan Districts) - 90 goals
 1973 - Phil Smith (West Perth) - 84 goals
 1972 - Austin Robertson (Subiaco) - 98 goals
 1971 - Austin Robertson (Subiaco) - 111 goals
 1970 - Austin Robertson (Subiaco) - 116 goals
 1969 - Austin Robertson (Subiaco) - 114 goals
 1968 - Austin Robertson (Subiaco) - 162 goals
 1967 - Phil Tierney (East Perth) - 119 goals
 1966 - Bob Johnson (East Fremantle) - 92 goals
 1965 - Austin Robertson (Subiaco) - 116 goals
 1964 - Austin Robertson (Subiaco) - 96 goals
 1963 - Ron Evans (West Perth) - 97 goals
 1962 - Austin Robertson (Subiaco) - 89 goals
 1961 - John Gerovich (South Fremantle) - 74 goals
 1960 - John Gerovich (South Fremantle) - 101 goals
 1959 - Neil Hawke (East Perth) - 114 goals
 1958 - Bill Mose (East Perth) - 115 goals
 1957 - Don Glass (Subiaco) - 83 goals
 1956 - John Gerovich (South Fremantle) - 74 goals
 1955 - Ray Scott (West Perth) - 83 goals
 1954 - Bernie Naylor (South Fremantle) - 133 goals
 1953 - Bernie Naylor (South Fremantle) - 167 goals
 1952 - Bernie Naylor (South Fremantle) - 147 goals
 1951 - Ray Scott (West Perth) - 141 goals
 1950 - Ron Tucker (Perth) - 115 goals
 1949 - George Prince (East Fremantle) - 82 goals
 1948 - Bernie Naylor (South Fremantle) - 91 goals
 1947 - Bernie Naylor (South Fremantle) - 108 goals
 1946 - Bernie Naylor (South Fremantle) - 131 goals
 1945 - Bill Baker (West Perth) - 91 goals
 1944 - Alan Watts (East Perth) - 101 goals
 1943 - Robin Farmer (Claremont) - 97 goals
 1942 - Ted Brunton (West Perth) - 94 goals
 1941 - George Doig (East Fremantle) - 141 goals
 1940 - George Moloney (Clarmont) - 129 goals
 1939 - Bert Gook (Perth) - 102 goals
 1938 - Ted Tyson (West Perth) - 126 goals
 1937 - George Doig (East Fremantle) - 144 goals
 1936 - George Doig (East Fremantle) - 109 goals
 1935 - George Doig (East Fremantle) - 113 goals
 1934 - George Doig (East Fremantle) - 152 goals
 1933 - George Doig (East Fremantle) - 106 goals
 1932 - Ted Tyson (West Perth) - 96 goals
 1931 - Doug Oliphant (Perth) - 84 goals
 1930 - Frank Hopkins (West Perth) - 79 goals
 1929 - Sol Lawn (South Fremantle) - 96 goals
 1928 - Sol Lawn (South Fremantle) - 75 goals
 1927 - Bonny Campbell (East Perth) - 87 goals
 1926 - Bonny Campbell (East Perth) - 89 goals
 1925 - Ted Flemming (West Perth) - 50 goals
 1924 - Bonny Campbell (East Perth) - 67 goals
 1923 - Dinney Coffey (East Fremantle) - 36 goals
 1922 - Bonny Campbell (South Fremantle) - 47 goals
 1921 - Allan Evans (Perth) - 64 goals
 1920 - Pat Rodriguez (Subiaco) - 36 goals

External links
 Bernie Naylor Medal (List of Recipients)

References

Naylor
Naylor
Australian rules football-related lists